In the Russian Empire, a colony was a type of settlement, typically agricultural, created under government encouragement in sparsely populated territories. Most commonly they were created by foreigners invited to resettle to Russia but there were also efforts to create Jewish colonies for resettling Jews from other areas within the Pale of settlement. The settlers were called colonists.

For example, this was done in newly acquired lands, such as Novorossiya and Bessarabia.

See also
Military settlement
Volga Germans
Slavo-Serbia
New Serbia
Jewish agricultural colonies of Bessarabia

References

Types of populated places
Russification
Settlement schemes in the Russian Empire
History of colonialism
Social history of Russia
Geographic history of Russia
Territorial evolution of Russia
Jewish Russian and Soviet history
Former populated places in Russia